The 2019–20 UC Davis Aggies men's basketball team represented the University of California, Davis in the 2019–20 NCAA Division I men's basketball season. The Aggies, led by ninth-year head coach Jim Les, played their home games at The Pavilion in Davis, California as members of the Big West Conference. They finished the season 14–18, 8–8 in Big West play to finish in a tie for fourth place. They were set to be the No. 5 seed in the Big West tournament. However, the Big West tournament was canceled amid the COVID-19 pandemic.

Previous season
The Aggies finished the 2018–19 season 11–20 overall, 7–9 in Big West play, finishing in a tie for 6th place. In the Big West tournament, they were defeated by Cal State Fullerton in the quarterfinals.

Roster

Schedule and results

|-
!colspan=12 style=| Non-conference regular season

|-
!colspan=9 style=| Big West regular season

|-
!colspan=12 style=| Big West tournament
|-

|-

Source

References

UC Davis Aggies men's basketball seasons
UC Davis Aggies
UC Davis Aggies men's basketball
UC Davis Aggies men's basketball